Social Democratic Party of Montenegro, or just the Social Democratic Party, abbr. SDP is a nationalist and social democratic political party in Montenegro. It is the only party in Montenegro to have full membership in the Socialist International. From 1998 until the 2016 coalition split, it was a minor coalition partner of the Democratic Party of Socialists, that lead Montenegro from the introduction of the multi-party system until the 2020 Montenegrin parliamentary election.

History
On 14 July 1991, members of Union of Reform Forces of Yugoslavia (SRSJ) from four coastal municipalities in the SR Montenegro, Herceg Novi, Kotor, Tivat and Budva, who were subsequently joined by reformists from Cetinje, formed the first regional Montenegrin political party - the Alliance of Reformists of the Montenegrin Coastline with Miodrag Marović as President. On 7 July 1992, the League united with Žarko Rakčević's Party of Socialists desiring to create a major Montenegrin party, forming the Social Democratic Party of Reformists (SDPR). Finally, on 12 June 1993, the Independent Organization of Communists of Bar, the Alliance of Reform forces of Yugoslavia for Montenegro and the Party of National Tolerance merged into it, forming the Social Democratic Party of Montenegro and uniting the forces that opposed the policies of the Milošević regime during the Yugoslav wars. Eventually, Yugoslav People's Party and Old Yugoslav People's Party also merged into SDP in the following years. Notable founders include Žarko Rakčević, Dragiša Burzan and Ljubiša Stanković.

When the policies of the ruling Democratic Party of Socialists of Montenegro (DPS) turned towards the goal of full independence for Montenegro, DPS and SDP started working closely together to achieve this goal. Allying itself with the DPS and Đukanović ahead of the 1998 parliamentary elections allowed the SDP to enter the parliament for the first time in its history. Since the 1998 election, SDP has continued to a minor coalition partner of DPS and a part of every Montenegrin government between 1998 and 2015. The goal of restoration of the Montenegrin independence was achieved following the victory in a referendum held on 21 May 2006. Current president of the SDP and President of the Parliament of Montenegro from 2003 to 2016, Ranko Krivokapić, officially proclaimed the independence of Montenegro on 3 June 2006.

Following the shift of the party towards a more critical and independent political course, in Autumn 2015 the pro-DPS faction of SDP formed a new party named Social Democrats of Montenegro (SD). On 22 January 2016, SDP officially left the ruling coalition with DPS and announced its support for a vote of no confidence against the government of Milo Đukanović on 25 January 2016. In the following 2016 parliamentary election SDP ran independently for the first time since 1996, and retained its parliamentary status, winning 5.23% of votes.

At the 2018 presidential elections, SDP nominated its MP Draginja Vuksanović, who was the first female presidential candidate in the history of Montenegro. Vuksanović finished third, winning 8.2% of the votes. On 29 June 2019, after Krivokapić resignation, Vuksanović was elected new president of the Party, making her the only female president of a Montenegrin political party, at the time. On this occasion, former President Krivokapic has been named honorary president.

Elections

Parliamentary elections 

Notes:

 Social Democratic Party of Reformists (SDPR). Shortly after the election, the SDPR merged with extra-parliamentary Socialist Party (SP) to form Social Democratic Party (SDP). SDPR-elected MPs joined the newly-formed SDP's parliamentary group.

The electoral threshold was set at 6% using the d'Hondt method, the threshold was returned to 3% for the next parliamentary election in 1998.
 Part of Coalition government (2012-2015); Opposition (2015-2016); Part of Provisional Government (2016)

Presidential elections

Positions held
Major positions held by Social Democratic Party of Montenegro members:

References

External links
Official site

1993 establishments in Montenegro
Centre-left parties in Europe
Full member parties of the Socialist International
Montenegrin nationalism
Parties related to the Party of European Socialists
Pro-European political parties in Montenegro
Progressive Alliance
Social democratic parties in Montenegro